In Greek mythology, Charis ("grace, beauty, and life") is one of the Charites or "Graces", goddesses of charm, beauty, nature, human creativity and fertility; and in Homer's Iliad. Charis was also known as Cale ("Beauty") or Aglaea ("Splendor").

References 

Greek goddesses
Beauty goddesses